Solomon Alijah Lewis Vera-Tucker (born June 17, 1999) is an American football guard for the New York Jets of the National Football League (NFL). He played college football at USC, where he was awarded the Morris Trophy in 2020 and was a two-time All-Pac-12 selection. Vera-Tucker was drafted by the Jets in the first round of the 2021 NFL Draft.

Early and high school
Vera-Tucker grew up in Oakland, California and attended Bishop O'Dowd High School. He played offensive tackle and defensive end on the football team and was named an Under Armour All-American as a senior. Vera-Tucker was rated a four-star recruit and committed to play college football at USC over offers from Washington, Oregon, Arizona, Arizona State, California, UCLA and Washington State.

College career
Vera-Tucker redshirted his true freshman season. Vera-Tucker played in all 12 of the Trojans games as a reserve guard and on special teams during his redshirt freshman season. He was named first-team All-Pac-12 Conference by the Associated Press. Vera-Tucker considered entering the 2020 NFL Draft, but opted to return to USC for his redshirt junior season. Following the announcement that Pac-12 would postpone the 2020 season, Vera-Tucker announced that he would opt out of the season in order to focus on preparing for the 2021 NFL Draft. Vera-Tucker reversed his decision to opt out after the Pac-12 announced that they would resume fall football.

Professional career

Vera-Tucker was selected by the New York Jets in the first round (14th overall) of the 2021 NFL Draft. He signed his four-year rookie contract with the Jets on July 20, 2021, worth $15.88 million. He was named the Jets starting left guard, and started 16 games there, and was named to the PFWA All-Rookie Team.

Vera-Tucker was named the Jets starting right guard in 2022 after the team signed left guard Laken Tomlinson. He started at left tackle in Week 4 after an injury to George Fant, then moved to right tackle in Week 5 after an injury to Max Mitchell, and started the next three games. He suffered a torn triceps in Week 7 and was placed on injured reserve on October 25, 2022.

References

External links 
 New York Jets bio
 USC Trojans bio

1999 births
Living people
USC Trojans football players
American football offensive guards
American football offensive tackles
Players of American football from Oakland, California
New York Jets players